André Fleury (30 March 1882 – 23 July 1974) was a French sport shooter who competed in the 1912 Summer Olympics and in the 1920 Summer Olympics.

He was born in Chantilly, Oise. In 1912 he was a member of the French team which finished sixth in the team clay pigeons event. In the individual trap competition he finished 27th. Eight years later he was part of the French team which finished seventh in the team clay pigeons event.

References

External links
 

1882 births
1974 deaths
French male sport shooters
Trap and double trap shooters
Olympic shooters of France
Shooters at the 1912 Summer Olympics
Shooters at the 1920 Summer Olympics